Hrovača is a settlement immediately to the southeast of the town of Ribnica in southern Slovenia. It lies just south of the town of Ribnica. The area is part of the traditional region of Lower Carniola and is now included in the Southeast Slovenia Statistical Region.

Name
The name Hrovača is derived from the word Hrvat 'Croat'. Like similar names (e.g., Hrvatini and Hrobači, a hamlet of Dobravlje), it originally referred to medieval Croatian resettlement from the south connected with Ottoman occupation of the central Balkans. In the past the German name was Krobatsch.

Mass grave
Hrovača is the site of a mass grave associated with the Second World War. Spelunkers have reported human remains at the site.

Church
The local church, built next to the cemetery on the southern outskirts of the settlement, is dedicated to the Holy Trinity and belongs to the parish of Ribnica. It was built in 1909 on the site of a 16th-century church originally dedicated to Saint James.

References

External links
Hrovača on Geopedia

Populated places in the Municipality of Ribnica